The Wazirs or Waziris are a Karlani Pashtun tribe found mainly in the Pakistan-Afghanistan border region. The Utmanzai are settled in the North Waziristan Agency and the Ahmadzai are in the South Waziristan Agency and Bannu domel. Those subgroups are in turn divided further, for example into Utmanzai tribes such as the Baka Khel and Jani Khel. The Wazirs speak the Waziristani dialect of Pashto.

The common ancestor of the Ahmadzai and Utmanzai is believed by them to be the eponymous Wazir, who is also ancestor to the Mehsud tribe that has since taken a distinct and divergent path. Through Wazir, the tribes trace their origins to Karlani and thence to the founder of the Pashtun lineage, Qais Abdur Rashid. Some western ethnologists consider them of being mix of Arachosian or Tatar ethnicity.

Although the Utmanzai and Mehsud tribes have a traditional rivalry and live in geographically distinct regions, the Ahmadzai and Mehsud communities co-exist peacefully and many head men are connected by marriage.

Notable members 
Maulana Noor Muhammad
Haji Mirzali Khan Wazir
Shah Muhammad Khan
Ali Wazir
Arif Wazir
Muolana shakirullah sahib
Zartaj Gul
Muhammad Iqbal Wazir
Ayesha Gulalai Wazir
Maria Toorpakai Wazir
Mir Kalam Wazir
Mohammad Wasim

References

Further reading 

Karlani Pashtun tribes